Second Baptist Church is an historic church building located in Centerville, Iowa, United States. It was listed on the National Register of Historic Places in 1999.

History
The congregation was organized in 1893 by African Americans. There were twelve people in the congregation when the church began. The congregation grew in size and by 1902 they desired their own church building. They began fundraising and the cornerstone for the structure was laid in June of that year. The wood-framed structure was designed in the Gothic Revival style.

Coal mining in the area began to decline in the 1920s and the congregation's membership peaked in the 1930s at 126 people. Opera singer Simon Estes sang in the church choir in the 1940s. The congregation continued to use the church until the early 1990s. The building sat empty for a short time until efforts to preserve it began in 1996. The restoration project was completed in 2003 and it is now used for musical and other events.

References

Religious organizations established in 1893
Churches completed in 1902
African-American history of Iowa
Gothic Revival church buildings in Iowa
Buildings and structures in Appanoose County, Iowa
Centerville, Iowa
National Register of Historic Places in Appanoose County, Iowa
Churches on the National Register of Historic Places in Iowa
Former Baptist church buildings in Iowa
1893 establishments in Iowa